Abigail Gutmann Doyle is a Professor of Chemistry at the University of California, Los Angeles, where she holds the  Saul Winstein Chair in Organic Chemistry. Her research focuses on the development of new chemical transformations in organic chemistry.

Early life and education 
Doyle was born in Princeton, NJ in 1980 to Michael W. Doyle and Amy Gutmann, the eighth president of the University of Pennsylvania and current United States Ambassador to Germany. Doyle studied chemistry as an undergraduate at Harvard University, graduating with A.B. and A.M. degrees summa cum laude in 2002.

After beginning graduate studies in the lab of Justin DuBois at Stanford University, Doyle completed her Ph.D. under Prof. Eric N. Jacobsen, where she developed enantioselective alkylations with tributyltin enolates catalyzed by a Cr(salen)Cl catalyst. She also worked on the development of an enantioselective addition of nucleophiles to oxocarbenium ions.

Career 

Independent career

In July 2008, Doyle was appointed as an Assistant Professor of Chemistry at Princeton University. She was promoted to the rank of Associate Professor with tenure in 2013, and to full Professor with an endowed chair, the A. Barton Hepburn Professor of Chemistry, in 2017. In 2021, she moved to the University of California, Los Angeles, where she holds the Saul Winstein Chair in Organic Chemistry. 

Research

A longstanding research interest of the Doyle group is the development of nickel-catalyzed C–C bond forming reactions that utilize unconventional cross-coupling electrophiles, such as epoxides, aziridines, imminium ions, and oxocarbenium ions. The group has developed and mechanistically interrogated new ligands and pre-catalysts for nickel, which have helped to enable these transformations. In collaboration with David MacMillan's group, the Doyle lab identified a new cross-coupling paradigm which allows the combination of photoredox and nickel catalysis. The Doyle lab has subsequently applied Nickel/photoredox catalysis to methodologies involving both unconventional and traditional cross-coupling electrophiles.

The group has also been involved in the development of nucleophilic fluorination chemistry allowing the creation of pharmaceutically-relevant molecules with sp3-C-F and sp2-C-F bonds. These methods have employed both transition metal and photoredox catalysis, and the group has developed new reagents for mild and selective deoxyfluorination reactions.

Recently, the Doyle group has worked in the area of data science-driven analysis of chemical reactions, including the implementation of machine learning algorithms to model and predict reaction outcome in organic chemistry.

Awards and honors 
Some key awards of Doyle's independent career include the Alfred P. Sloan Foundation Fellowship (Alfred P. Sloan Foundation, 2012), Amgen Young Investigator Award (2012), Arthur C. Cope Scholar Award (American Chemical Society, 2014), Bayer Early Excellence in Science Award (2013), Phi Lambda Upsilon National Fresenius Award (Phi Lamba Upsilon, 2014), Presidential Early Career Award for Scientists and Engineers (PECASE, 2014) BMS Unrestricted Grant in Synthetic Organic Chemistry (2016).

She is currently Senior Editor, Accounts of Chemical Research.

References

Living people
Harvard College alumni
Princeton University faculty
21st-century American chemists
American people of German-Jewish descent
Jewish American scientists
1980 births
21st-century American Jews
Harvard Graduate School of Arts and Sciences alumni
Recipients of the Presidential Early Career Award for Scientists and Engineers